Liberal or liberalism may refer to:

Politics
 a supporter of liberalism
 Liberalism by country
 an adherent of a Liberal Party
 Liberalism (international relations)
 Sexually liberal feminism
 Social liberalism

Arts, entertainment and media
 El Liberal, a Spanish newspaper published 1879–1936
 The Liberal, a British political magazine published 2004–2012
 Liberalism (book), a 1927 book by Ludwig von Mises
 "Liberal", a song by Band-Maid from the 2019 album Conqueror

Places in the United States
 Liberal, Indiana
 Liberal, Kansas
 Liberal, Missouri
 Liberal, Oregon

Religion
 Religious liberalism
 Liberal Christianity
 Liberalism and progressivism within Islam
 Liberal Judaism (disambiguation)

See also
 
 
 Liberal arts (disambiguation)
 Neoliberalism, a political-economic philosophy
 The Liberal Wars, a civil war in Portugal in the early 19th century